Chamillitary may refer to:

 Chamillitary Entertainment, a record/entertainment company owned and run by Chamillionaire
 Chamillionaire (born 1979), Founder of Chamillitary Entertainment
 The Color Changin' Click, a rap group also called Chamillitary